Miller Grove may refer to:

 Miller Grove, Texas, an unincorporated community in Texas
 Miller Grove High School (Texas), a high school within Miller Grove, Texas
 Miller Grove Independent School District, a Texan school district
 Miller Grove High School (Georgia), a high school in Georgia